Kotla Bazza Singh is a village in Batala in Gurdaspur district of Punjab State, India.

Demography 
, the village has a total number of 138 houses and the population of 687 of which 366 are males while 321 are females.  According to the report published by Census India in 2011, out of the total population of the village 269 people are from Schedule Caste.

See also 
List of villages in India

References

External links 
 Tourism of Punjab
 Census of Punjab

Villages in Gurdaspur district